The 2013 ITU World Triathlon Series was a series of eight World Championship Triathlon events that led up to a Grand Final held in London in September 2013. The Series was organised under the auspices of the world governing body of triathlon, the International Triathlon Union (ITU).

The World Triathlon Series (WTS) visited Auckland, San Diego, Madrid, Yokohama, Kitzbühel, Hamburg, Stockholm, and London.

The series included two sprint distance races and six Olympic distance races. The series stop in Hamburg also served as the location for the 2013 ITU Team Triathlon World Championships. The Grand Final in London included the World Championships for Under 23, Junior and Paratriathlon division, which were decided over a single race. Elite level competitors were crowned champions based on the final WTS point standings.

Calendar
The 2013 series visited eight cities around the world.

Results

Medal summary

Men

Women

Overall
Overall rankings after all 8 events

Men

Women

References

2013
World Triathlon Series
International sports competitions in London
Triathlon competitions in the United Kingdom
2013 in English sport